Felipe Esparza is a Mexican born American stand-up comedian and actor. He began performing stand-up in 1994. He won Last Comic Standing in 2010.

Esparza has hosted a weekly podcast called What's Up Fool? since 2014.

Early life and education
Felipe Esparza was born in Sinaloa, Mexico. He lived on his mother's family's ranch in Sinaloa before moving with his family to live with his aunt in Tijuana, where they lived for about two years. His father had left the family to go to the United States alone. Eventually, in the years prior to Reagan's Amnesty, Esparza illegally immigrated with his two brothers and his mother to the United States, traveling in the car of a "coyote" smuggler. During the trip, they were stopped at a checkpoint in San Clemente, California and he was held in a holding cell with his brothers, separate from their mother for a short period of time. The family was deported. They attempted the trip again, but were stopped and deported again. They tried a third time, using passports of cousins who lived in California. They changed cars twice and were driven to Carson, California. They were then moved to the Boyle Heights neighborhood of Los Angeles, where his father was living. Esparza was raised in the Aliso Village housing projects of Boyle Heights. He attended Theodore Roosevelt High School.

Career
Esparza began performing stand-up in 1994 after a stint in drug rehab. He won Last Comic Standing in 2010.

Personal life
Esparza is married to Lisa Esparza.

He has been vegan since 2011.

Works

Comedy specials

Filmography

Film

Television

References

Living people
Mexican comedians
Comedians from California
Last Comic Standing winners
Mexican emigrants to the United States
People from Boyle Heights, Los Angeles
People from Sinaloa
1976 births
Mexican expatriate actors in the United States